KOLJ is a radio station airing a classic country format licensed to Quanah, Texas, broadcasting on 1150 kHz AM. The station is owned by James G. Boles, Jr.

FM Translators
KOLJ is also heard on 100.7 FM through a translator located in Quanah, Texas and on 101.7 FM through a translator located in Vernon, Texas.

References

External links
Paradise Broadcasting Website

Classic country radio stations in the United States
OLJ (AM)